Vanslow Luke Phillips (born 27 March 1972) is an English professional golfer.

Phillips was born in London. As an amateur, he won the Berkshire Trophy twice before turning professional after playing in the Walker Cup at the end of 1993. In 1996 he won the Interlaken Open on the second tier Challenge Tour, and graduated to the European Tour for the following season by finishing in 6th place on the tour rankings at the end of the year.

Phillips made steady progress, finishing inside the top 100 on the Order of Merit in each of his first four seasons on the European Tour. He captured his maiden win in 1999, at the Algarve Portuguese Open, where he overcame John Bickerton in a playoff. In 2001, he struggled to hold on to his tour card, and has competed mostly on the Challenge Tour since then. He won the Mauritius Open, a non-tour event in 2006.

Early in his professional career Phillips regularly played in a shirt and tie as part of a sponsorship deal.

Amateur wins
1992 Berkshire Trophy
1993 Berkshire Trophy, Golf Illustrated Gold Vase

Professional wins (4)

European Tour wins (1)

European Tour playoff record (1–0)

Challenge Tour wins (1)

Jamega Pro Golf Tour wins (1)

Other wins (1)
2006 Mauritius Open

Results in major championships

CUT = missed the half-way cut
Note: Phillips only played in The Open Championship.

Team appearances
Amateur
Walker Cup (representing Great Britain & Ireland): 1993

References

External links

English male golfers
European Tour golfers
Golfers from London
People from Camberley
1972 births
Living people